A chocolataire is a type of social gathering which ranges from large events (such as fund raising and invitation only) to smaller functions (similar in structure to informal tea parties), in which all food and drink are composed of or contain some form of chocolate.  Considered obsolete by some, this entertainment was at its peak popularity around the turn of the 20th century (the process for making milk chocolate having been brought to market in 1875), and was seen as a novel alternative to the other forms of social gathering at the time.

Food and drink
The menu at a chocolataire may include any variety of chocolate-based dishes: cakes, wafers, bonbons, candy, and pastry being a few examples thereof. These dishes can also be seasonal. Examples of seasonal dishes can include hot chocolate and chocolate fondue during cold months and chocolate lemonade or chocolate ice cream during the summer.

Ceremony

As the chocolataire grew in popularity, the ceremony itself became more chocolate-themed—the menu cards, programs, decorations, and even the costumes of the waiters were of chocolate color; chocolate cups and saucers were sometimes sold with the chocolate that was served in them, or given as a souvenir for those who purchased chocolate.
The chocolataire saw use in every social gathering imaginable—one was even thrown as part of a fund raising function for a kindergarten in Indiana—and it was not uncommon, after all guests had been served, to hold an auction of remaining candy, loaves of cake, and boxes of chocolate left over from preparation of the dishes.

Modern use
The modern analog to the traditional chocolataire is found in some bridesmaid and bachelorette parties (where traditional chocolate foods and candies like truffles and cake are joined by newer recipes like chocolate beer and martinis), and restaurants like "Death by Chocolate" in New Zealand and Canada featuring all-chocolate menus.

References

Chocolate events
Eating parties
High society (social class)
Upper class culture